Mervyn Edmunds (13 January 1932 – 27 August 2015) was a New Zealand cricketer. He played nine first-class matches for Otago between 1958 and 1960.

See also
 List of Otago representative cricketers

References

External links
 

1932 births
2015 deaths
New Zealand cricketers
Otago cricketers
Cricketers from Wellington City